Nixdorf may refer to:

Companies
Nixdorf Computer AG (1968-1990), a former computer company based in Paderborn, Germany
Siemens Nixdorf Informationssysteme (1990-1999), a company formed when Siemens purchased Nixdorf Computer AG
Wincor Nixdorf, a German corporation, which is a successor of Siemens Nixdorf Informationssysteme, that provides retail and retail banking hardware, software and services

People
Heinz Nixdorf, a German businessman and founder of Nixdorf Computer AG.

Places
Nixdorf, the German name for Mikulášovice, a town in the Czech Republic